Émile Bonvouloir (April 21, 1875 – August 11, 1969) was a Canadian provincial politician.

Born in Sainte-Brigide-d'Iberville, Quebec, Bonvouloir was the member of the Legislative Assembly of Quebec for Iberville from 1939 to 1944.

References

1875 births
1969 deaths
People from Montérégie
Quebec Liberal Party MNAs